The 2021 WNBA season was the 23rd season for the Minnesota Lynx of the Women's National Basketball Association. The season began on May 14, 2021, versus the Phoenix Mercury.

The 2021 season brought teams back to their home markets instead of playing in a "Bubble" like they did in the 2020 season. The Lynx returned to Target Center and played in front of limited fans. The Lynx also revealed new jerseys on April 8. Three new jerseys - Heroines, Explorers, and Rebels - were used through the season. Each uniform embodies player and team characteristics – attitude, potential, power, and honors not only our fans, but the community as well. The Rebel jersey is inspired by First Avenue.

The Lynx started the season slowly, losing their first four games.  However, they won their last game in May, in overtime, over the Connecticut Sun to finish May 1–4.  The team's fortunes turned around in June as they posted a 7–3 record.  They won their first two games and last three games of the month, and the middle contained a pattern of alternating losses and wins.  In July, the Lynx continued their winning streak from the end of June, winning all four games in July.  Their seven game winning streak before the Olympic break catapulted them to a 12–7 record at the break.  Coming out of the break, the Lynx won their first game before losing two straight games in Connecticut.  After those back to back losses, they won five straight games.  The streak was ended on September 8 in Las Vegas.  However, the team won its last four games, which included three straight wins against Indiana, who finished last in the league.  Their 4–2 August record, combined with a 6–1 September mark saw the Lynx finish 22–10 in third place in the standings.  The team also had a remarkable 13–3 home record during the season, tied for second best in the league.

As the third seed in the 2021 WNBA Playoffs, the Lynx earned a bye into the Second Round, and would host the lowest remaining seed from the First Round.  The Lynx drew Chicago, the 6th seed as their opponent.  Chicago finished the season 16–16 but defeated the Lynx 76–89 in the game to end the Lynx' season.

Transactions

WNBA Draft

Trades/Roster Changes

Roster

Depth

Schedule

Preseason

|- style="background:#fcc;"
| 1
| May 1
| @ Atlanta
| L 61–69
| CarletonShepard (10)
| ShepardAchonwaHarper (6)
| Japreece Dean (4)
| Gateway Center ArenaNo Fans
| 0–1
|- style="background:#cfc;"
| 2
| May 8
| Washington
| W 79–69
| Rachel Banham (23)
| Jessica Shepard (10)
| Natalie Achonwa (5)
| Target CenterNo Fans
| 1–1

 The preseason game vs. Atlanta was a scrimmage. The second half gave both teams multiple possessions and was not be played like a real game.

Regular season

|- style="background:#fcc;"
| 1
| May 14
| Phoenix
| L 75–77
| Aerial Powers (18)
| Sylvia Fowles (11)
| DantasDangerfield (4)
| Target Center2,021
| 0–1
|- style="background:#fcc;"
| 2
| May 18
| @ New York
| L 75–86
| Sylvia Fowles (26)
| Sylvia Fowles (11)
| Crystal Dangerfield (6)
| Barclays Center815
| 0–2
|- style="background:#fcc;"
| 3
| May 20
| Seattle
| L 78–90
| Crystal Dangerfield (22)
| Sylvia Fowles (9)
| PowersDangerfield (6)
| Target Center1,934
| 0–3
|- style="background:#fcc;"
| 4
| May 28
| @ Seattle
| L 72–82
| Sylvia Fowles (15)
| AchownaFowles (6)
| Napheesa Collier (6)
| Angel of the Winds Arena1,332
| 0–4
|- style="background:#cfc;"
| 5
| May 30
| Connecticut
| W 79–74 (OT)
| Sylvia Fowles (24)
| Sylvia Fowles (9)
| DantasMcBride (5)
| Target Center2,007
| 1–4

|- style="background:#cfc;"
| 6
| June 4
| Atlanta
| W 86–84
| Napheesa Collier (26)
| Sylvia Fowles (11)
| Layshia Clarendon (5)
| Target Center2,024
| 2–4
|- style="background:#cfc;"
| 7
| June 6
| Atlanta
| W 100–80
| Kayla McBride (19)
| Sylvia Fowles (7)
| Napheesa Collier (6)
| Target Center2,021
| 3–4
|- style="background:#fcc;"
| 8
| June 8
| @ Washington
| L 81–85
| Napheesa Collier (22)
| Napheesa Collier (9)
| ClarendonDangerfield (6)
| Entertainment and Sports Arena2,100
| 3–5
|- style="background:#cfc;"
| 9
| June 12
| Los Angeles
| W 80–64
| Crystal Dangerfield (16)
| Sylvia Fowles (9)
| ClarendonCollier (4)
| Target Center2,203
| 4–5
|- style="background:#fcc;"
| 10
| June 15
| Chicago
| L 89–105
| Napheesa Collier (27)
| Sylvia Fowles (9)
| ClarendonDangerfield (5)
| Target Center2,024
| 4–6
|- style="background:#cfc;"
| 11
| June 17
| @ Dallas
| W 85–73
| Kayla McBride (22)
| Sylvia Fowles (12)
| Layshia Clarendon (5)
| College Park Center1,519
| 5–6
|- style="background:#fcc;"
| 12
| June 19
| @ Dallas
| L 77–95
| CollierDangerfield (17)
| Sylvia Fowles (7)
| Layshia Clarendon (6)
| College Park Center1,751
| 5–7
|- style="background:#cfc;"
| 13
| June 23
| @ Atlanta
| W 87–85
| Sylvia Fowles (26)
| Sylvia Fowles (19)
| Layshia Clarendon (9)
| Gateway Center Arena907
| 6–7
|- style="background:#cfc;"
| 14
| June 25
| Las Vegas
| W 90–89 (OT)
| Sylvia Fowles (30)
| Sylvia Fowles (14)
| Napheesa Collier (8)
| Target Center2,734
| 7–7
|- style="background:#cfc;"
| 15
| June 30
| @ Phoenix
| W 82–76
| Kayla McBride (26)
| CollierFowles (11)
| Crystal Dangerfield (7)
| Phoenix Suns Arena4,122
| 8–7

|- style="background:#cfc;"
| 16
| July 3
| @ Phoenix
| W 99–68
| Kayla McBride (24)
| Sylvia Fowles (10)
| CollierShepard (6)
| Phoenix Suns Arena8,182
| 9–7
|- style="background:#cfc;"
| 17
| July 7
| Dallas
| W 85–79
| Kayla McBride (25)
| Sylvia Fowles (11)
| Layshia Clarendon (8)
| Target Center2,321
| 10–7
|- style="background:#cfc;"
| 18
| July 9
| @ Las Vegas
| W 77–67
| Layshia Clarendon (18)
| FowlesDantas (9)
| Layshia Clarendon (9)
| Michelob Ultra ArenaN/A
| 11–7
|- style="background:#cfc;"
| 19
| July 11
| @ Los Angeles
| W 86–61
| Napheesa Collier (27)
| Damiris Dantas (8)
| Layshia Clarendon (8)
| Los Angeles Convention Center892
| 12–7

|- style="background:#cfc;"
| 20
| August 15
| New York
| W 88–78
| Sylvia Fowles (20)
| Sylvia Fowles (11)
| Layshia Clarendon (8)
| Target Center3,534
| 13–7
|- style="background:#fcc;"
| 21
| August 17
| @ Connecticut
| L 60–72
| Sylvia Fowles (14)
| Sylvia Fowles (5)
| AchonwaClarendon (3)
| Mohegan Sun Arena3,488
| 13–8
|- style="background:#fcc;"
| 22
| August 19
| @ Connecticut
| L 71–82
| Sylvia Fowles (18)
| Sylvia Fowles (11)
| Layshia Clarendon (8)
| Mohegan Sun Arena3,536
| 13–9
|- style="background:#cfc;"
| 23
| August 21
| @ Chicago
| W 101–95
| Layshia Clarendon (18)
| DantasMcBride (7)
| Layshia Clarendon (5)
| Wintrust Arena5,036
| 14–9
|- style="background:#cfc;"
| 24
| August 24
| Seattle
| W 76–70
| Sylvia Fowles (29)
| Sylvia Fowles (20)
| Layshia Clarendon (6)
| Target Center3,634
| 15–9
|- style="background:#cfc;"
| 25
| August 31
| New York
| W 74–66
| Kayla McBride (25)
| Napheesa Collier (14)
| Rachel Banham (5)
| Target Center3,221
| 16–9

|- style="background:#cfc;"
| 26
| September 2
| Los Angeles
| W 66–57
| Kayla McBride (17)
| Sylvia Fowles (17)
| CarletonCollier (4)
| Target Center3,121
| 17–9
|- style="background:#cfc;"
| 27
| September 4
| Washington
| W 93–75
| Napheesa Collier (21)
| Napheesa Collier (9)
| Rachel Banham (8)
| Target Center3,403
| 18–9
|- style="background:#fcc;"
| 28
| September 8
| @ Las Vegas
| L 81–102
| Aerial Powers (20)
| Sylvia Fowles (11)
| CollierMcBride (4)
| Michelob Ultra Arena5,663
| 18–10
|- style="background:#cfc;"
| 29
| September 10
| Indiana
| W 89–72
| Aerial Powers (20)
| FowlesShepard (7)
| BanhamDangerfield (5)
| Target Center3,503
| 19–10
|- style="background:#cfc;"
| 30
| September 12
| Indiana
| W 90–80
| Napheesa Collier (22)
| Sylvia Fowles (8)
| Napheesa Collier (7)
| Target Center3,434
| 20–10
|- style="background:#cfc;"
| 31
| September 17
| @ Indiana
| W 92–73
| Sylvia Fowles (21)
| Sylvia Fowles (10)
| Bridget Carleton (5)
| Indiana Farmers ColiseumN/A
| 21–10
|- style="background:#cfc;"
| 32
| September 19
| @ Washington
| W 83–77
| Aerial Powers (27)
| Sylvia Fowles (13)
| Layshia Clarendon (6)
| Entertainment and Sports Arena2,854
| 22–10

Playoffs 

|- style="background:#fcc;"
| 1
| September 26
| Chicago
| 76–89
| Aerial Powers (24)
| Sylvia Fowles (8)
| Aerial Powers (4)
| Target Center4,334
| 0–1

Standings

Playoffs

Statistics

Regular Season

Awards and Milestones

References

External links

Minnesota Lynx seasons
Minnesota Lynx
Minnesota Lynx